Cyrtodactylus cryptus  is a species of gecko that is found in Vietnam and Laos.

References 

Cyrtodactylus
Reptiles described in 2007